Chakaria is an upazila of Cox's Bazar District in the Division of Chittagong, Bangladesh.

Geography

It has 63671 households and a total area of 643.46 km2. Once there was a mangrove forest named Chakaria Sunderban here. But now it is no more.

Demographics
According to the 1991 Bangladesh census, Chakaria had a population of 409, 346. Males constituted 51.87% of the population, and females 48.13%.

Chakaria Town
Chakaria Town has an area of 2.95 km2. The town is known as " CHIRINGA " . It has a population of 50716; male 52.64%, female 47.36%. The literacy rate among town people is 34.5%. It has three dak bungalows.

Administration
Chakaria thana was constituted in 1793 and was turned into an upazila in 1983.

Chakaria Upazila is divided into Chakaria Municipality and 18 union parishads: Badarkhali, Baraitali, Bheola Manikchar, Bamo Bilchari, Chiringa, Demusia, Dulahazara, Fashiakhali, Harbang, Kaiarbil, Kakhara, Khuntakhali, Konakhali, Lakhyarchar, Paschim Bara Bheola, Purba Bara Bheola, Saharbil, and Surajpur Manikpur. The union parishads are subdivided into 48 mauzas and 212 villages.

Chakaria Bazar Municipality is subdivided into 9 wards and 23 mahallas.

Archaeological heritage
Tomb of Shah Umar, Sat-gumbad Masjid of Fazl Quke at Manikpur (1873), Hasher Dighi, Bir Kamla Dighi, Dolhazara Safari Park, Chawarfari Mangrove Forest.

Historical events
During the war of liberation in 1971, the Pak army killed 13 villagers by gunshot and burnt more than one hundred houses and shops in different places of the upazila.

Marks of War of Liberation
Shaheed Abdul Hamid memorial monument.

Religious institutions
Mosque 500, temple 99, church 3, pagoda 16, mazar 6.

Old institutions

Educational institutions in the Upazila include:
 Manikpur Burmese Government Primary School (1828)
 Harbang Government Primary School (1884)
 Kaharia Ghona Government Primary School (1914)
 Pekua Government Primary School (1918)
 Saharbil Anwarul Ulum Senior Madrasa (1918)
 Chakaria Government High School (1930)
 Illishia Jamila Begum High School (1945)
 Chakaria Government Girls' High School (1968)
 Chakoria pre cadet grammar School (1998)
 Quality Computer Chakaria (2000)
 Computer Tech-IT Solution Malumghat (2016)
 Chakaria Korak Biddayapith (1990)
 Chakaria Cambrian School (2011)
 চিরিংগা ইসলামিয়া এমদাদুল উলুম মুহিউচ্ছুন্নাহ মাদ্রাসা (1975)
 মারকাজুস সুন্নাহ চকরিয়া । (2018)
Chakaria Central high school (1972)

Media
Weekly Chakori, fortnightly Mehdi.

Cultural organizations
52, literary organization 3, women's organization 22, theatre party 2, playground 50.

Main Exports
Shrimp, salt, tobacco, groundnut, mustard seed, flour, watermelon, timber, coastal Fish.

See also
 Upazilas of Bangladesh
 Districts of Bangladesh
 Divisions of Bangladesh

References

External links
 Local Government Engineering Department, Cox's Bazar, Union Parishad List

Upazilas of Cox's Bazar District